The Guide (Wommat) is the seventh studio album by Senegalese singer and composer Youssou N'Dour. Recorded during the autumn of 1993 in both New York City and Dakar, the album was released on July 11, 1994, through Columbia Records. Featuring the hit single "7 Seconds", a duet with Neneh Cherry, The Guide (Wommat) is the commercially most successful album by Youssou N'Dour.

Track listing
Leaving (Dem) (Youssou N'Dour) – 05:03
Old Man (Gorgui) (Youssou N'Dour) – 06:30
Without a Smile (Same) (Youssou N'Dour) – 04:12 (featuring Branford Marsalis)
Mame Bamba (Youssou N'Dour) – 04:58
7 Seconds (Neneh Cherry / Cameron McVey / Youssou N'Dour / Jonathan Sharp) – 05:06
How You Are (No Mele) (Youssou N'Dour) – 03:39
Generations (Diamono) (Youssou N'Dour) – 05:46
Tourista (Youssou N'Dour) – 04:36
Undecided (Japoulo) (Youssou N'Dour) – 05:26
Love One Another (Beuguente) (Youssou N'Dour) – 04:51
Life (Adouna) (Youssou N'Dour) – 04:04
My People (Samay Nit) (Youssou N'Dour) – 04:38
Oh Boy (Youssou N'Dour) – 04:37
Silence (Tongo) (Youssou N'Dour) – 04:38
Chimes of Freedom (Youssou N'Dour) – 04:51

Charts

Certifications

References

1994 albums
Youssou N'Dour albums
Columbia Records albums